Andrea Gentile (born 9 February 1980) is an Italian retired footballer who played as a midfielder.

Career
Born in Aosta Valley, Gentile started his career at Juventus. After spent 2002–03 season loaned back to Aosta for Serie D side Valle d'Aosta, along with Luigi Lavecchia were loaned to Brescello, where Gentile played for 2 seasons. He then loaned to Serie B side Triestina.

In 2003, along with Lavecchia and Salvatore Aronica were sold to Messina for €1.5 million (€500,000 each) in co-ownership deal. Gentile won promotion to Serie A in June 2004, but went back to Serie B for Arezzo on loan, along with Lavecchia.

In 2005–06 season, as first he went to Torino on loan, after a limited chance, he went to Crotone on loan. In June 2006, the co-ownership contract of Juve and Messina expired, Gentile now fully owned by Messina. Gentile remained at Crotone for the first half of the season, played 4 starts in 11 appearances. In mid-season, he left for Serie C1 side Monza on loan (exchanged with Vinicio Espinal).

In July 2007, he left for Padova in co-ownership deal, signed a 2+1 year contract. In June 2008 Padova acquire the remain rights form Messina few weeks before the bankrupt of Messina. He then played 15 league matches for Padova before released on 30 June 2009. Padova won promotion to Serie B in June 2009

In March 2010, Olbia of Lega Pro Seconda Divisione announced the signing of Gentile.

References

External links
 
 Profile at FIGC 
 Profile at La Gazetta dello Sport 
 Profile at AIC.Football.it 

Italian footballers
Serie B players
Juventus F.C. players
U.S. Triestina Calcio 1918 players
A.C.R. Messina players
S.S. Arezzo players
Torino F.C. players
F.C. Crotone players
A.C. Monza players
Calcio Padova players
Association football midfielders
People from Aosta
1980 births
Living people
Footballers from Aosta Valley